Phyllis M. Wise (Chinese name 王斐丽) is a biomedical researcher. Most recently, she is currently serving as the inaugural Chief Executive Officer and President of Colorado Longitudinal Study.

Family and education
Wise is the daughter of Mamie Wang and Shih-Chun Wang.

Wise received a bachelor's degree in biology from Swarthmore College in 1967, an M.A. (1969) and then a doctorate (1972) in zoology from the University of Michigan. She was a postdoctoral fellow there from 1972–74.

Career

University professor
In 1976, Wise was appointed assistant professor of physiology at the University of Maryland, Baltimore. In 1993, she was appointed professor of physiology and chair of the department at the University of Kentucky in Lexington, Kentucky. In 2002, she became  dean of the College of Biological Sciences at University of California-Davis, holding also the rank of distinguished professor of neurobiology, physiology and behavior in its College of Biological Sciences, and professor of physiology and membrane biology in its School of Medicine.

University of Washington
Starting in 2005, Wise served as provost and vice president for academic affairs at the University of Washington. Later, she held the position of interim president there in 2010–2011. During her service at the University of Washington, she led the establishment of the College of the Environment.

University of Illinois at Urbana-Champaign
From 2011-2015, Wise served as chancellor of the University of Illinois at Urbana-Champaign. She led the establishment of a unique engineering-driven college of medicine aimed toward training the next generation of doctors to use technology and big data to develop new materials, new devices, new imaging, and new robotics to provide better medical care to more people at lower cost. In August 2015, Wise resigned the chancellorship at Urbana-Champaign, and, shortly after, university administrators released emails Wise had hidden from FOIA requests regarding the Steven Salaita hiring controversy.

Memberships and honors
She is a member of the National Academy of Medicine, and the American Academy of Arts and Sciences, and is also a Fellow of the American Association for the Advancement of Science and the American Physiological Society. She was a member of the board of directors of Nike and First Busey Corporation. She serves on the RAND Health,  the Robert Wood Johnson Foundation, and Colorado Children's Hospital boards of directors.

She was awarded honorary degrees from Swarthmore College (2008) and the University of Birmingham (2015).

References

External links
 University press release

21st-century American biologists
Living people
Swarthmore College alumni
Leaders of the University of Illinois
University of Michigan alumni
University of Maryland, Baltimore faculty
20th-century American scientists
20th-century American women scientists
21st-century American women scientists
Year of birth missing (living people)
Kentucky women scientists
Women heads of universities and colleges
Members of the National Academy of Medicine